Alexander Louis Stevas (January 30, 1923 – June 3, 2020) was the 17th Clerk of the Supreme Court of the United States, a position he held from 1981 to 1985.

References

1923 births
2020 deaths
Clerks of the Supreme Court of the United States
People from New Castle, Pennsylvania